Chascolytrum brizoides is a species of grass in the family Poaceae. It is found in Buenos Aires, Uruguay, Rio Grande do Sul and Biobio.

References

External links
 
 Calotheca elegans at Tropicos
 Chascolytrum elegans at Tropicos

Pooideae
Grasses of South America
Grasses of Argentina
Grasses of Brazil
Flora of Uruguay
Plants described in 2011